In mathematics, the Cartan decomposition is a decomposition of a semisimple Lie group or Lie algebra, which plays an important role in their structure theory and representation theory.  It generalizes the polar decomposition or singular value decomposition of matrices.  Its history can be traced to the 1880s work of Élie Cartan and Wilhelm Killing.

Cartan involutions on Lie algebras 

Let  be a real semisimple Lie algebra and let  be its Killing form. Such an involution is called a Cartan involution on  if  is a positive definite bilinear form.

Any real semisimple Lie algebra has a Cartan involution, and any two Cartan involutions are equivalent.

Examples 

This is the Cartan involution on  if and only if  is the Lie algebra of a compact Lie group.
 The following maps are involutions of the Lie algebra  of the special unitary group SU(n):
 The identity involution , which is the unique Cartan involution in this case.
 If  is odd, . The involutions (1), (2) and (3) are equivalent, but not equivalent to the identity involution since .
 If  is even, there is also .

Cartan pairs 

Let  be an involution on a Lie algebra .  Since , the linear map  has the two eigenvalues .  If  and  denote the eigenspaces corresponding to +1 and -1, respectively, then .  Since  is a Lie algebra automorphism, the Lie bracket of two of its eigenspaces is contained in the eigenspace corresponding to the product of their eigenvalues. It follows that

This notion of a Cartan pair here is not to be confused with the distinct notion involving the relative Lie algebra cohomology .

Cartan decomposition on the Lie group level 

Let  be a non-compact semisimple Lie group and  its Lie algebra. Then:
 There is a Lie group automorphism  with differential  at the identity that satisfies .

The automorphism  is also called the global Cartan involution, and the diffeomorphism  is called the global Cartan decomposition. If we write 
this says that the product map  is a diffeomorphism so .

For the general linear group,  is a Cartan involution.

Moreover,

 
where .

In the compact and noncompact case the global Cartan decomposition thus implies

Relation to polar decomposition 

Consider  with the Cartan involution . Then  is the real Lie algebra of skew-symmetric matrices, so that , while  is the subspace of symmetric matrices.  Thus the exponential map is a diffeomorphism from  onto the space of positive definite matrices.  Up to this exponential map, the global Cartan decomposition is the polar decomposition of a matrix. The polar decomposition of an invertible matrix is unique.

See also 

 Lie group decompositions

Notes

References 

Lie groups
Lie algebras